Elena Aleksandrovna Zhdanova (born 23 October 1980) is a paralympic sprinter from Russia. She competed at the 1996, 2000 and 2004 Paralympics and won bronze medals in the 400 m in 1996 and in the 200 m in 2000. She placed fourth in the 100 m and 200 m in 2004.

References

Paralympic athletes of Russia
Athletes (track and field) at the 1996 Summer Paralympics
Athletes (track and field) at the 2000 Summer Paralympics
Athletes (track and field) at the 2004 Summer Paralympics
Paralympic bronze medalists for Russia
1980 births
Living people
Medalists at the 1996 Summer Paralympics
Medalists at the 2000 Summer Paralympics
Paralympic medalists in athletics (track and field)
Russian female sprinters
People from Biysk
Sportspeople from Altai Krai
20th-century Russian women
21st-century Russian women
Visually impaired sprinters
Paralympic sprinters